Lamaar Edward Thomas (born April 23, 1990) is an American football wide receiver who is currently a free agent. He was signed as an undrafted free agent by the Denver Broncos after the 2013 NFL Draft. He played college football and ran track at New Mexico, after transferring from Ohio State University, where he also participated in track and field.

Professional career

Denver Broncos
Thomas signed with the Denver Broncos on April 28, 2013 after the 2013 NFL Draft. He was released on August 31, 2013 during final cuts.

Jacksonville Jaguars
Thomas was signed to the Jacksonville Jaguars' practice squad on October 1, 2013. He was promoted to the active roster on December 20. He made his first career reception on December 22 in a game against the Tennessee Titans. The Jaguars released Thomas on August 25, 2014.

New Orleans VooDoo
Thomas was assigned to the New Orleans VooDoo of the Arena Football League (AFL), on March 6, 2015.

Career statistics

References

External links
Jacksonville Jaguars bio
New Mexico Lobo bio

Living people
People from Fort Washington, Maryland
Players of American football from Maryland
American football wide receivers
Ohio State Buckeyes football players
Ohio State Buckeyes men's track and field athletes
New Mexico Lobos football players
Denver Broncos players
Jacksonville Jaguars players
New Orleans VooDoo players
1990 births
New Mexico Lobos men's track and field athletes